Zachary Tyler Eisen (born September 23, 1993) is an American former voice actor.  He voiced Aang in Avatar: The Last Airbender, Lucas Nickle in The Ant Bully, Andrew in Nick Jr's Little Bill and Pablo in the American animated television series The Backyardigans. His film roles include Entropy (1999) and Marci X (2003). While living in Connecticut, he did most of his Avatar: The Last Airbender recordings via satellite from there and New York. He currently works in the entertainment industry behind the camera.

Filmography

Film

Television

Video games

References

External links

1993 births
Living people
21st-century American male actors
American male child actors
American male film actors
American male voice actors
Male actors from Stamford, Connecticut
Syracuse University alumni